Sir Richard  Bulkeley Williams-Bulkeley, 10th Baronet  (23 September 1801 – 28 August 1875) was an English Whig and Liberal Party politician who sat in the House of Commons variously between 1831 and 1868.

Bulkeley-Williams was born as Williams to Sir Robert Williams, 9th Baronet and his wife Anne Lewis. In 1827 he assumed by Royal licence the additional surname of Bulkeley on succeeding to the estates of Thomas James Bulkeley, 7th Viscount Bulkeley. He owned the Caerau mansion at Cylch-y-Garn.

At the 1831 general election Williams-Bulkeley was elected Member of Parliament (MP) for Beaumaris. In the reformed parliament he was elected at the 1832 general election as MP for Anglesey, and held the seat until 1837. He was elected as MP for Flint Boroughs in 1841 and held the seat until 1847. He then stood again and was elected at Anglesey and held the seat until 1868. He served as Lord Lieutenant of Caernarvonshire from 7 March 1851 to 14 September 1866.

Williams-Bulkeley died at the age of 74.

Williams Bulkeley  married Maria Frances Massey-Standley, daughter of Thomas Stanley Massey-Standley,  on 30 August 1832. He was succeeded in the Baronetcy by his son Richard.

References

External links
 

 

1801 births
1875 deaths
UK MPs 1832–1835
UK MPs 1831–1832
UK MPs 1835–1837
UK MPs 1841–1847
UK MPs 1847–1852
UK MPs 1852–1857
UK MPs 1857–1859
UK MPs 1859–1865
UK MPs 1865–1868
Liberal Party (UK) MPs for Welsh constituencies
Baronets in the Baronetage of England
Lord-Lieutenants of Caernarvonshire
High Sheriffs of Anglesey
Members of the Parliament of the United Kingdom for Beaumaris